Deçan Mountain is a mountain in the west of Kosovo, in the Prokletije range, rising to a height of 2,200m above sea level. It and the village of Deçan located near it share the same name. Deçan Mountain and its neighbour Gjeravica can be viewed as far as Radonjićko Lake.

Notes

References

Mountains of Kosovo
Accursed Mountains
Two-thousanders of Kosovo